Vermin (Edward Whelan) is a supervillain appearing in American comic books published by Marvel Comics. The character is usually depicted as an adversary of Captain America and Spider-Man. A geneticist working for Baron Zemo and Arnim Zola, Edward Whelan was subjected to an experiment that mutated him into a humanoid rat, gaining superhuman abilities, as well as the predatory instincts of a rat. The character's most notable appearance was in the storyline "Kraven's Last Hunt".

Publication history

The character's first appearance was in Captain America #272 (August 1982). He was created by J. M. DeMatteis and Mike Zeck.

He became a Spider-Man villain as well in Marvel Team-Up #128 (April 1983), fighting both Captain America and Spider-Man.

Fictional character biography
Edward Whelan suffered severe physical and sexual abuse as a child from his father. As an adult, he became a geneticist working for Baron Helmut Zemo and Primus I (who was impersonating Arnim Zola). After being subjected to an experiment by Primus, his skin becomes a light pinkish fur color and he is mutated into a cannibalistic, humanoid rat. Vermin is defeated by Captain America and turned over to S.H.I.E.L.D. He escapes S.H.I.E.L.D., however, and returns to the service of Zola and Zemo. Vermin is shackled by Zemo with Captain America in a dungeon; he battles, mutates, escapes, and wounds Zemo.

Vermin later battles Captain America and Spider-Man at a street festival and is captured. Some time later, Vermin kidnaps women off the streets into the sewers, and devours them. He is defeated and captured by Kraven the Hunter disguised as Spider-Man; Kraven sought to prove himself superior to Spider-Man by defeating Vermin alone when Spider-Man needed Captain America to help him. He is forced by Kraven to battle the real Spider-Man, then allowed to escape; he is finally captured and turned over to the police by Spider-Man. During the breakout from the supervillain prison the Vault, Vermin assists Venom in hunting down Warden Marsh. Under Venom's orders, Vermin later teams with Powderkeg and Mentallo; they temporarily defeat Iron Man and Hank Pym. Mentallo's powers are used to neutralize the break out.

Vermin eventually escapes the asylum, and attacks his parents at their home in Scarsdale. He is captured by Spider-Man and returned to psychiatric care. In response to treatment from Dr. Ashley Kafka, he temporarily reverts to his human form.

Under continued treatment from Dr. Kafka, Whelan's original human form eventually becomes his default state, and he only changes to Vermin for a few hours at a time. He and Kafka are kidnapped by a group of other Zemo mutants, who want Whelan to become Vermin again and lead them in their quest for revenge. Instead, Whelan persuades them to surrender themselves for psychiatric treatment so that they can be cured as he was. However, Baron Zemo uses a mind-control device to take control of the mutates and revert Whelan to Vermin, intending to use them as subjects for further experiments. His will strengthened by his psychiatric care, Whelan partially reverts to human form and attacks Zemo. Dr. Kafka convinces him to not kill Zemo, and by letting go of his hate Whelan allows "Vermin" to finally die. No longer confined to psychiatric institutions, he submits to trial for his crimes as Vermin. Top defense attorney Matt Murdock agrees to be his lawyer for the case.

Whelan reverts to his Vermin state once again when he teams up with Bloodscream to fight Wolverine.

During the breakout of the Raft orchestrated by Electro, Vermin attacks Spider-Man after Count Nefaria knocks him into a hole with the other escaping villains. He is later seen fighting Captain America.

Vermin is later incarcerated in New York's experimental "Ant-Hill" prison, where all prisoners are reduced in size thanks to Hank Pym's Pym particles. An escape attempt is thwarted by She-Hulk.

Vermin is among the villains recruited to join the Hood's crime syndicate. He helps them fight the New Avengers, but is taken down by Doctor Strange.

During the Secret Invasion storyline, he is among the many supervillains who rejoins the Hood's crime syndicate. Vermin, the Syndicate and an army of heroes attack and defeat an invading Skrull force in Central Park.

During the Dark Reign storyline, Vermin joins with the Hood's gang in an attack on the New Avengers, who were expecting the Dark Avengers instead.

During the Fear Itself storyline, Vermin attacks Spider-Man, who is struggling to deal with the fear and chaos that is gripping Manhattan.

Vermin returns in The Amazing Spider-Man storyline "Kraven's First Hunt". He attacks the new Kraven the Hunter for intruding on his tunnels, and is beaten by her very badly. He escapes outside and runs into Spider-Man, who is wearing a Daredevil costume. Not recognizing his old foe, Vermin attacks, overwhelming him, and taking a bite out of his shoulder. Up close, Vermin is able to identify Spider-Man's scent. Appealing to the last shred of humanity within Vermin, Spider-Man convinces him to reveal where Kraven is. Vermin later attacks Kraven again, but is defeated and captured by her.

As part of the All-New, All-Different Marvel, Vermin appears as a member of Maker's New Revengers.

During the Search for Tony Stark arc, Vermin rejoined Hood's gang and assisted in the attack on Castle Doom.

During the Hunted storyline, Vermin was seen attacking people until he is defeated by Lizard and Taskmaster who then hand him over to Arcade. Vermin is being kept captive by Arcade. Vermin bites Arcade's finger in defiance. In fear of being killed by Arcade, Vermin reveals that Lizard and Taskmaster are working against Arcade. Arcade puts a serum into Vermin's skin causing him to spawn clones of him in the cage. Spider-Man is overwhelmed by the Vermin clones when they attack him. Just when he is about to be killed, Kraven the Hunter repels the Vermin clones and saves Spider-Man. After the Great Hunt is over, some of Vermin's surviving clones are seen lurking in the subway.

Powers and abilities
Vermin's strength was enhanced by the experimental mutagenic process designed by Arnim Zola, and forced upon him. His agility, reflexes, and durability are roughly equivalent to the absolute peak attainable for the human body but, unlike his strength, speed and stamina, they do not reach superhuman levels. He has extremely acute senses, particularly his sense of smell. Vermin has inch-long claw-like fingernails, razor-sharp pointed teeth, and fur covering most of his body, giving him the appearance of a humanoid rat. Eventually, Vermin gained the ability to revert to human form at will.

Vermin has the ability to control rats and stray dogs within a two-mile (3 km) radius of his person. It has not been clearly explained how he does this but some writers have implied it might be hyper-sonic communication.

Though Vermin has no formal martial arts training, he utilizes bestial ferocity, animal cunning, and instincts which make him a very formidable hand-to-hand combatant. He once bested Spider-Man in a physical struggle, but Kraven the Hunter prevented Vermin from killing Spider-Man.

Special skills
Before being altered by Zola, Whelan was an accomplished geneticist.  As Vermin, his intellect is reduced to a childlike (yet cunning) level and he suffers from paranoid delusions.

Reception
 In 2021, CBR.com ranked Vermin 5th in their "Marvel: 10 Characters Baron Zemo Created In The Comics" list.

Other versions

Ultimate Marvel
In the Ultimate Marvel universe, Edward Whelan used to work for S.H.I.E.L.D. before its dissolution, which led to him living in the sewers where he had a psychic connection with Agent Crock. Vermin and Agent Crock ruled the sewers with an iron fist until they encountered the Young Ultimates during their search for Crossbones. After being unable to reason with them, Shadowcat phased through Agent Crock's head enough to kill him and even Vermin as a side effect of their psychic connection.

In other media
 Vermin was originally meant to appear in Spider-Man.
 Vermin appears as a boss in The Amazing Spider-Man, with vocal effects provided by Steve Blum. This version is an ordinary rat that was injected with human DNA and became one of Oscorp's cross-species experiments created from Dr. Curt Connors' notes. Later, Spider-Man finds and defeats Vermin to collect a blood sample necessary to create an antidote for a virus that the cross-species carry.

References

External links
 Vermin at Marvel.com
 Vermin at Spiderfan.org

Characters created by J. M. DeMatteis
Comics characters introduced in 1982
Fictional African-American people
Fictional cannibals
Fictional characters with superhuman senses
Fictional genetically engineered characters
Fictional geneticists
Marvel Comics characters who are shapeshifters
Marvel Comics characters who can move at superhuman speeds
Marvel Comics characters with superhuman strength
Marvel Comics hybrids
Marvel Comics mutates
Marvel Comics scientists
Marvel Comics supervillains
Spider-Man characters